Nancy Joan Simons (born May 20, 1938), later known by her married name Nancy Peterson, is an American former competition swimmer and Olympic medalist.  She represented the United States as an eighteen-year-old at the 1956 Summer Olympics in Melbourne, where she won a silver medal as a member of the second-place U.S. team in the women's 4×100-meter freestyle relay with Sylvia Ruuska, Shelley Mann and Joan Rosazza.  She also competed individually in the women's 100-meter freestyle, but did not advance beyond the event semifinals.

See also

 List of Olympic medalists in swimming (women)
 List of Stanford University people

References

External links
  Nancy Simons – Olympic athlete profile at Sports-Reference.com

1938 births
Living people
American female freestyle swimmers
Olympic silver medalists for the United States in swimming
Sportspeople from Oakland, California
Stanford University alumni
Swimmers at the 1956 Summer Olympics
Medalists at the 1956 Summer Olympics
21st-century American women
Swimmers from California